Andrea Pozzato (born 15 May 1988) is an Italian professional footballer who plays as a goalkeeper, currently contracted with Trapani.

Career

Juventus
Pozzato began his professional career within the youth ranks of Serie A giants, Juventus. In 2006–07 season he was the backup of Matteo Trini along with Giorgio Merlano. Pozzato was graduated from the Primavera youth squad in 2007, and was loaned out to Tritium for his first full season, in attempt to gain regular playing time. The young keeper managed to obtain a starting position at the club, making 34 starts in his lone season.

Lega Pro career
In summer 2008 he left for Lega Pro Seconda Divisione team Canavese in co-ownership deal. In June 2010 Juve gave up the remain 50% registration rights to Canavese.

In July 2010 he left Canavese to join Melfi. After spending the first half of the 2011–12 season as a free agent, he signed a contract in January 2012 to become second goalkeeper at Lega Pro Prima Divisione promotion hopefuls Trapani; he played two regular season games, plus both legs in the subsequent promotion playoff semifinals against Cremonese (ended in a win for his side).

Notes

1988 births
Living people
Italian footballers
Juventus F.C. players
Tritium Calcio 1908 players
F.C. Canavese players
People from Novara
Association football goalkeepers
Footballers from Piedmont
Sportspeople from the Province of Novara